Man-Killer is a name used by two supervillains appearing in American comic books published by Marvel Comics. The second version Katrina Luisa Van Horn has been viewed by critics as a "caricature of feminists, who despised all men."

Publication history
The first version of Man-Killer first appeared in Captain America #111 (December 1968) and created by Stan Lee and Jim Steranko.

Man-Killer first appeared in Marvel Team-Up volume 1 #8 (April 1973) and created by Gerry Conway and Jim Mooney. The character subsequently appeared in Daredevil vol. 1 #121 (May 1975), 123 (July 1975), Iron Man vol. 1 #126-127 (September–October 1979), and Marvel Team-Up vol. 1 #107 (July 1981), where she seemingly died.  The character appeared several years later in Web of Spider-Man Annual #3 (1987), and made several appearances in Thunderbolts vol. 1, including issues #3 (June 1997), #18-20 (August–November 1998), 23-25 (February–April 1999), 27 (June 1999), 30 (September 1999), 34-35 (January–February 2000), 39-42 (June–September 2000), and in Deadline #2 (July 2002). After joining the Thunderbolts and taking the name Amazon, she appeared in Thunderbolts vol. 1 #64-65 (July–August 2002), 67 (September 2002), 69 (October 2002), 71 (November 2002) Marvel Universe: The End #5-6 (July–August 2003), Thunderbolts vol. 1 #73-75 (December 2002-February 2003), 80-81 (August–September 2003), New Thunderbolts #18 (April 2006), and Thunderbolts vol. 2 #100 (May 2006). She received an entry in the Official Handbook of the Marvel Universe A-Z 2006 #7.

Fictional character biography

Robot
Mankiller was a robotic assassin sent by Madame Hydra to kill Captain America, but the robot is defeated and destroyed.

Katrina Luisa Van Horn
Katrina Luisa Van Horn was an Olympic skier and is a militant feminist. After engaging in an argument with anti-Women's Liberation skier Karl Lubbings, the two took their disagreement to the slopes. Katrina was an Olympic-level skier, but Lubbings cut her off and both skiers plunged off the mountain. Katrina was severely injured and disfigured. She was fitted with a powered exoskeleton and took the name Man-Killer (she no longer wears the exoskeleton so it is probable her strength has been enhanced somehow). She has worked freelance and as an agent for HYDRA. 

Man-Killer has been a member of the Masters of Evil under the Crimson Cowl.

As Amazon, she was briefly a member of the Thunderbolts under Hawkeye.

She had fought Spider-Man on some occasions.

During an altercation with the Thunderbolts, Katrina told Songbird that she'd rather not fight her, as she had no problems with women, just with men (Songbird attacked her anyway). Some time later however, Erik Josten (Atlas of the Thunderbolts) discovered Katrina working as a bartender in his team's adopted home of Burton Canyon, Colorado. When Josten became a regular at the bar Katrina was congenial towards him, pretending not to recognize him as Atlas. Whatever animosity Katrina may or may not bear towards men, she has proven herself capable of working alongside them with a minimum of personality conflicts.

Man-Killer is seen to be among the new recruits for Camp H.A.M.M.E.R.

Man-Killer later appears as part of Baron Helmut Zemo's third incarnation of the Masters of Evil where they attacked the Winter Soldier's incarnation of the Thunderbolts. During the "Opening Salvo" part of the Secret Empire storyline, Man-Killer was involved in the Masters of Evil's next fight with the Thunderbolts which ends in her apparent death at the hands of Kobik.

Powers and abilities
Katrina Luisa Van Horn was given robotic implants replacing and/or compounded with bones and nerves, which give her superhuman powers, good athletic abilities, and the ability to throw knives at a range of hundreds of meters. She was also given Pym particles to grow in strength proportionate to size.

In other media
 The Robot version of Man-Killer appears in the Avengers Assemble episode "New Year's Resolution". This version is Kang the Conqueror's time-travelling robotic assassin. Two pose as Hydra agents to eliminate Howard Stark, but the first one is destroyed by Peggy Carter and the second one sent the two into the future before merging with the Iron Legion only to be destroyed by its intended target.

References

External links
 Man-Killer at Marvel.com
 Man-Killer at SpiderFan.org
 Leader's Lair
 
 Gay League Profile

Comics characters introduced in 1973
Fictional bartenders
Fictional blade and dart throwers
Fictional German people
Fictional Olympic competitors
Fictional skiers
Hydra (comics) agents
Marvel Comics characters with superhuman strength
Marvel Comics cyborgs
Marvel Comics mutates